John "Hot Rod" Williams (August 9, 1962 – December 11, 2015) was an American professional basketball player in the National Basketball Association (NBA) from 1986 to 1999.

Early life 
Williams was born in Sorrento, Louisiana, a small town near Baton Rouge. He got the nickname "Hot Rod" as a baby due to his habit of making engine-like noises as he scooted backwards across the floor.

College basketball 
A 6'11" power forward/center, he played collegiately at Tulane University, leaving as that school's second all-time leading scorer. His career at Tulane was somewhat checkered, however. According to a Tulane booster club president, Williams was nearly kicked off the team in his sophomore year "for missing practices and for being unreliable". Additionally, he was a marginal student at best. He barely maintained a C average in high school, and had barely passed the SAT.  At Tulane, his grade point average hovered in the C-D range despite a schedule laden with "decidedly non-academic" courses such as driver's education and weight training.

Arrest 
On March 27, 1985, Williams was arrested for suspicion of point shaving.  According to the indictment, Williams had taken at least $8,550 from Gary Kranz for influencing point spreads in games against Southern Miss, Memphis State and Virginia Tech.  Williams was charged with sports bribery and conspiracy; his first trial ended with a mistrial, but during his second trial a jury found him not guilty of all five counts. Due in part to the scandal, Tulane shuttered its men's basketball program from 1985 to 1989.

NBA career 
Williams was selected by the Cleveland Cavaliers in the 1985 NBA draft with the 21st pick of the second round (45th overall). However, due to the trial, Williams spent the 1985–86 season playing for the United States Basketball League. Able to play for the Cavaliers the next year, Williams was named to the NBA all-rookie team for the 1986-87 season, along with teammates Ron Harper and Brad Daugherty. Perhaps Williams' finest season occurred in 1989, when he averaged 16.8 points, 8.1 rebounds and 2.04 blocked shots per game while mostly serving as the team's sixth man.  Following the 1989-90 season, he re-signed with the Cavaliers to a 7-year, $26.5 million contract, making him one of the five highest paid players in the NBA in the early 1990s. At the time, this was an unprecedented salary for a sixth man like Williams. Prior to March 22, 2009, he ranked as the Cavaliers' all-time leader in blocked shots (1,200) (surpassed by Žydrūnas Ilgauskas). Williams spent nine seasons with the Cavaliers before being traded to the Phoenix Suns for Dan Majerle during the 1995 offseason. He finished out his NBA career with the Dallas Mavericks.

Personal life and death
Williams had five children; John Williams Jr., John Francis Williams, Johnna Williams, John Paul Williams, and Sydney Gibbs. His nephew, Toe Nash, played professional baseball.

Williams was diagnosed with colon cancer in April 2014, and died on December 11, 2015 at Our Lady of the Lake Regional Medical Center in Baton Rouge, Louisiana, at age 53.

See also

List of National Basketball Association career blocks leaders

References

External links
basketball-reference career statistics
NBA.com biography
ESPN.com description of Tulane scandal

1962 births
2015 deaths
African-American basketball players
Basketball players from Louisiana
Centers (basketball)
Cleveland Cavaliers draft picks
Cleveland Cavaliers players
College basketball controversies in the United States
Dallas Mavericks players
Deaths from prostate cancer
People from Ascension Parish, Louisiana
Phoenix Suns players
Power forwards (basketball)
Tulane Green Wave men's basketball players
Deaths from cancer in Louisiana
American men's basketball players
United States Basketball League players
20th-century African-American sportspeople
21st-century African-American people